Naanayam (lit. coin or integrity) is a 2010 Indian Tamil-language heist thriller film written and directed by Shakti Soundar Rajan in his directorial debut. Produced by Atharsh Capital Film Works, the film stars Prasanna as the protagonist; Sibiraj as the antagonist; singer S. P. Balasubrahmanyam;  Ramya Raj, who has appeared in the films Sandai and Thee; and debutante Yasmin. The film, which has songs by Subramaniapuram fame composer James Vasanthan and score by  Thaman, was released on 14 January 2010.

Plot
The plot opens with the introduction of Ravi (Prasanna), an electronics engineer who introduces himself as a youthful guy who aspires to become a businessman. He meets Viswanath (S. P. Balasubrahmanyam), the CEO of Trust Bank, in a golf course when he fights to grab a bag belonging to Viswanath from a stranger. Ravi saves Viswanath and chases the stranger. He is unable to catch the man but gets a glimpse of his face. Viswanath thanks Ravi, offers him a job in his bank, and also assures to provide a loan of Rs. 2 crores to start his own business. The bank promotes its new branch as the "world's safest bank" with the security locker designed by Ravi. Ravi works in Trust Bank for five years, but his loan approval gets rejected so many times despite Viswanath's attempts to get it approved.

Ravi meets a girl named Nandhini (Ramya Raj), a divorced news reporter, in a golf club and they become friends. Slowly, love blossoms between them. However, Ravi, once during his date with Nandhini, is attacked by Nandhini's ex-husband Raghu. He counterattacks him and goes home. At home, Ravi meets Fareed (Sibiraj), who tells that Ravi killed Raghu and that there are evidences to prove. Fareed also kidnaps Nandhini. Ravi is confident that he did not kill Raghu, but he has to obey the words of helping them rob the bank to save himself and Nandhini.

Fareed says that he is an ex-employee of Trust Bank and was fired by Viswanath for fund mismanagement. So, Fareed wants to take revenge on Viswanath by robbing Trust Bank, which will negatively impact its trustworthiness, and he wants Ravi to help him as he is the one behind the safety system design. Ravi and Fareed plan to rob the bank, which has infrared lasers and a four-leveled lock system vault. Meanwhile, Ravi records the conversations going on between them and hands it over to his assistant Devaki to save himself. Ravi demands Rs. 2 Crore, the photographic evidences of the murder from the robbers before the theft. Fareed initially gives it but takes it back and gives Ravi a bag similar to it.

Ravi discloses all the security systems to enter the vault, and Fareed and his men enter the vault. However, Ravi did not inform them about a secret exit in the vault, and he makes a plan to get Fareed and his men trapped. Ravi suddenly escapes through the secret exit, locks others inside the vault, and rushes to meet Viswanath, where he also sees Nandhini with him. Ravi gets shocked seeing Nandhini along with Viswanath and gets to know the truth. The robbery is actually a plan of Viswanath, who did it in order to grab the bag, which has evidences of his illegal affair with Nandhini, who is actually named Eswari. The stranger took pictures of Viswanath and Eswari and blackmails Viswanath for money. The stranger also safely places the evidence in Trust Bank's locker. To steal the evidence, Viswanath planned a robbery with Fareed, Eswari's brother. The man who Ravi was told to be killed by him was actually a new employee in Fareed's gang. Viswanath apologizes to Ravi for the trouble created by him and commits suicide. Fareed and Eswari are arrested, and all of Fareed's gang members die inside the vault due to lack of oxygen.

Ravi destroys all the evidence of the illegal affair of Viswanath and finds Rs. 2 Crore in the back side of his car, which actually was demanded by him from Fareed, and which he uses to start his new business.

Cast
 Prasanna as Ravi
 Sibiraj as Fareed
 S. P. Balasubrahmanyam as Viswanath
 Ramya Raj as Eswari / Nandhini
 Yasmin as Devaki
 Jasper as Henchman

Production
In November 2008, the film began its pre-production with Prasanna being signed on to play the lead role, whilst before the end of the year, Sibiraj and Ramya Raj also signed on to be a part of Charan's project. The film progressed quietly through 2008 under the working title of Kavasam, with the subject being described as a "crime thriller". The music for the film released in November 2009, whilst the film released the following January coinciding with the Tamil festival of Thai Pongal.

Soundtrack

Film score (BGM) was composed by Thaman of Eeram and Mundhinam Paartheney fame. The songs were composed by James Vasanthan of Subramaniapuram and Pasanga fame, who for the first time scores music for a thriller film. Actor Silambarasan and music composer Devi Sri Prasad sung together for one song, apart from the likes of S. P. Balasubrahmanyam, K. S. Chithra and Sunitha Sarathy.

Release

Box office
The film opened in most centres across Chennai, Tamil Nadu to a mixed opening. The filmgrossed Rs. 7,99,274 in the opening weekend in Chennai

Reviews
Upon release, the film generally received mixed reviews. In reference to the performances, Rediff claimed that Prasanna is "sweet, savvy, intense and desperate as the situation demands" and that his diction "too is superb". It went on to claim that Sibiraj, who makes more of an impact, despite that "he apes his esteemed father often, especially in tone of voice and modulation" but "he seems to have had a blast doing it". Ramya Raj has "more than one role to play, and does justice to it" whilst SPB plays his role with "élan". In reference to the script, Behindwoods criticized it by labelling that "the script employs countless twists and turns, although only a few of them really work – before which the damage of ruining it is already done", whilst also mentioning that "Naanayam also feels like it is inspired from a vaguely familiar Hollywood movie."

References

External links
 

2010 crime thriller films
2010 films
Indian heist films
Films about organised crime in India
2010s Tamil-language films
2010 directorial debut films
Films scored by James Vasanthan
2010s heist films